= Carlisle Building =

Historic building in Ohio, US

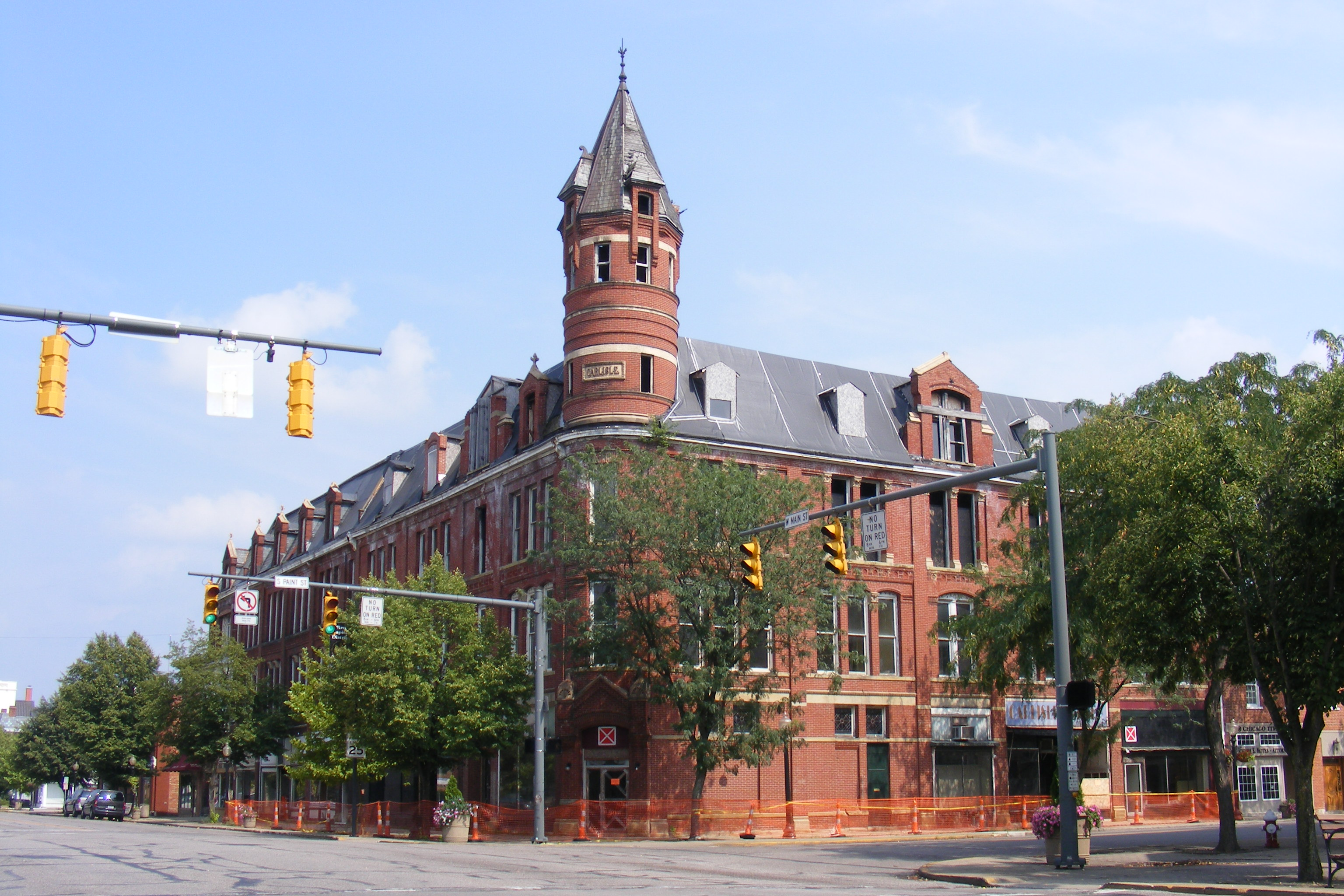
- Carlisle Building in Chillicothe, Ohio

General information
- Location: Chillicothe, Ohio, 9 S Paint St, Chillicothe, OH 45601
- Completed: 1885
- Owner: Adena Health System

Design and construction
- Architects: John F. Cook and Charles B. Cook

The Carlisle Building is a historic building in downtown Chillicothe, Ohio.

The original owner of the block was John Carlisle, who moved to Chillicothe in 1798. The building that was first built to hold Jhis business was demolished in January 1885 before being replaced with what stands today.

It was designed by half-brothers John F. Cook and Charles B. Cook. The construction of the building was completed in 1885. It was added to the National Register of Historic Places in 1979.

The building was built using bricks from Zanesville, Ohio. It has a stone and terracotta trim and a slate roof. The main feature of the building is a five story circular tower that sits at the corner.

On April 26, 2003, the building was set on fire by two juveniles.

December 2003, KG&R, a historic restoration company, took ownership of the building. In October 2007, it was bought by Carlisle Tower LLC. The Chesler Group partnered with Adena Health System in 2014 to start renovation. The building was officially reopened in October 2015. In October 2021, Adena Health System bought the Carlisle Building.
